The Roman Catholic Diocese of Taizhou/Linhai  is a diocese located in the city of Taizhou, Zhejiang in the Ecclesiastical province of Hangzhou in China.

History
 August 10, 1926: Established as Apostolic Vicariate of Taizhou 台州 from the Apostolic Vicariate of Ningbo 寧波
 April 11, 1946: Promoted as Diocese of Taizhou 台州

Leadership
 Bishops of Taizhou 台州 (Roman rite)
 Bishop Anthony Xu Ji-wei (2010 - September 25, 2016)
 Bishop Joseph Hu Jo-shan, C.M. (胡若山) (April 11, 1946 – August 28, 1962)
 Vicars Apostolic of Taizhou 台州 (Roman Rite)
 Bishop Joseph Hu Jo-shan, C.M. (胡若山) (July 30, 1926 – April 11, 1946)

References

 GCatholic.org
 Catholic Hierarchy

Roman Catholic dioceses in China
Christian organizations established in 1926
Roman Catholic dioceses and prelatures established in the 20th century
Christianity in Zhejiang
Taizhou, Zhejiang